The Oakland Expressway Bridge (sometimes called the East Topeka Interchange) is an automobile crossing of the Kansas River at Topeka, Kansas.
It is open to traffic, and also carries K-4 as well.  The bridge used drilled shaft construction technology when built in 1996.

References

Bridges over the Kansas River
Road bridges in Kansas
Girder bridges in the United States